Robyn and Ryleigh Gillespie are a sister duo of country/pop singer-songwriters from Langley, British Columbia.

In 2013, their self-titled debut album Robyn and Ryleigh was released on Raincoast Music/MDM Recordings.

Robyn & Ryleigh were signed to Royalty Records in 2015, and have distribution through Sony Music Entertainment. The sisters released a single with Royalty called "I Found You" on 18 May 2015.

Robyn and Ryleigh were nominated in 2015 for British Columbia Country Music Association awards (BCCMA Awards) in the categories of Group/Duo of the Year, Songwriter of the Year, and Website of the Year.

Discography

Studio albums

Singles

Music videos

References

External links 
 

Country music duos
Canadian country music groups
Canadian musical duos
Musical groups from British Columbia
Year of birth missing (living people)
Living people